Resurface is a 2017 short documentary film about a veteran who was on the verge of suicide before finding an outlet in the form of surfing.

The documentary was released on Netflix on September 1, 2017.

Cast
 Bobby Lane
 Van Curaza
 Martin Pollock
 Mike Shurley
 Sean Meyer
 Wallace J. Nichols

Release
It was released on September 1, 2017 on Netflix streaming.

References

External links
 
 
 

2017 short documentary films
American short documentary films
Netflix original documentary films
2010s English-language films
2010s American films